Mieux vaut mal vivre que mourir (in English: "Almost Nothing Is Better Than Nothing At All") is a 2007 documentary film, directed by  Justine Bitagoye and Gaudiose Nininahazwe. The literal translation of the film's title is "It is better to live badly than to die".

Synopsis
The daily life of a young boy who lives off the dump, like all those surrounding him. This is the place he grew up in, that fed him and where he finds the articles he sells to survive. This film tenderly recounts the harsh and humble life of dump dwellers.

Production and Release 
The film is a Belgium-Benin co-production, and the first collaboration between the co-directors Bitagoye and Nininahazwe. It was released in 2006 following a production workshop in which the two took part.

Mieux vaut mal vivre que mourir was screened at multiple international film festivals, including:

 2008 Monte Carlo Television Festival - Special mention
 2007 Leuven Afrika Film Festival - non competitive 
 2007 Afrique Taille XL - non competitive (Brussels)
 FESPACO 2007 - Special mention (Ouagadougou)
 African Film Festival of Cordoba-FCAT
 Festival de Cine Africano de Tarifa-Tánger
 Festival International du Film de Ouidah (Bénin)
 Festival de Musique, Esperanzah! ( "Cameras Sud") (Belgium)
 Afrikazabaldu
 Quintessence 2008

The film was included in the short film collection from East Africa, Short(s) of Africa - East African Shorts, release in 2010.

References

Creative Commons-licensed documentary films
Belgian documentary films
Burundian documentary films
Belgian short documentary films
Documentary films about poverty
2006 short documentary films
2006 films